Roslyn "Ross"/"Ros"" Reynolds (31 January 1930  – third ¼ 1976) was an English professional rugby league footballer who played in the 1940s and 1950s. He played at club level for the Featherstone Rovers (Heritage № 309).

Playing career
Roslyn Reynolds made his début for the Featherstone Rovers on Saturday 24 September 1949.

Genealogical information
Roslyn Reynolds' marriage to May (née Parkes) was registered during first ¼ 1953 in Lower Agbrigg district. They had children; Diane M. Reynolds (birth registered during first ¼  in Wakefield district).

References

External links
Search for "Reynolds" at rugbyleagueproject.org

1930 births
1976 deaths
English rugby league players
Featherstone Rovers players
Rugby league players from Pontefract